Christmas Time Again is the eleventh studio album by American Southern rock band Lynyrd Skynyrd, released in 2000.

Track listing
"Santa's Messin' with the Kid" (Eddie C. Campbell) – 3:15
"Rudolph the Red-Nosed Reindeer" (Johnny Marks) – 2:31
"Christmas Time Again" (Rickey Medlocke, Dale Krantz Rossington, Gary Rossington, Hughie Thomasson, Johnny Van Zant) – 4:34
"Greensleeves" (Traditional) – 2:18
"Santa Claus Is Coming to Town" (credited on the album as being performed by "Charlie Daniels") (Haven Gillespie) – 3:08
"Run Run Rudolph" (Marvin Brodie, Marks) – 3:32
"Mama's Song" (Medlocke, G. Rossington, Thomasson, J. Van Zant) – 3:52
"Santa Claus Wants Some Lovin'" (Mack Rice) – 3:39
"Classical Christmas" (Medlocke, J. Van Zant) – 2:09
"Hallelujah, It's Christmas" (credited on the album as being performed by "38 Special") (Don Barnes, Danny Chauncey, Donnie Van Zant) – 4:01
"Skynyrd Family" (Medlocke, G. Rossington, Thomasson, J. Van Zant) – 3:00

Personnel
Lynyrd Skynyrd
Johnny Van Zant – Lead vocals
Gary Rossington – Guitar
Billy Powell – Keyboards, piano
Leon Wilkeson – Bass, background vocals - (credited, but does not appear on the album)
Rickey Medlocke – Guitars, background vocals
Hughie Thomasson – Guitars, background vocals
Michael Cartellone – Drums, percussion

Additional musicians
Dale Krantz-Rossington – Background vocals
Carol Chase – Background vocals
Mike Brignardello – Bass (standing in for Leon Wilkeson)
Mark Pfaff – Harp (track 1)
Bill Cuomo – Keyboards (tracks 3,4 & 9)
Charlie Daniels – Guitar, vocals (track 5)
Taz DiGregorio – Keyboards (track 5)
Charlie Hayward – Bass (track 5)
Pat McDonald – Drums, percussion (track 5)
Mark Matejka – Guitar, vocals (track 5)
Chris Wormer – Guitar, vocals (track 5)
Danny Chauncey (credited as being part of "38 Special", instrument(s) played not noted)
Don Barnes (credited as being part of "38 Special", instrument(s) played not noted)
Donnie Van Zant (credited as being part of "38 Special", instrument(s) played not noted)

Chart positions

References

2000 Christmas albums
Lynyrd Skynyrd albums
MCA Records compilation albums
Christmas albums by American artists